The yellow-throated bunting (Emberiza elegans), also known as the elegant bunting, is a species of bird in the family Emberizidae.

It is found in China, Japan, Korea, Myanmar, Russia, and Taiwan. Its natural habitats are temperate forests and subtropical or tropical dry forests.

Emberiza elegans follows Type II chain migration. Research on isotopes from feathers has revealed that northern populations begin migration before southern populations. Additionally, a latitudinal gradient in hydrogen isotopes suggest that northern breeders spend winters farther north than their southern counterparts.

References

yellow-throated bunting
Birds of China
Birds of Manchuria
Birds of Korea
yellow-throated bunting
Taxonomy articles created by Polbot